Milwaukee Road 261 is a class "S3" 4-8-4 "Northern" type steam locomotive built by the American Locomotive Company (ALCO) in Schenectady, New York in July 1944 for the Milwaukee Road.

It was used for heavy mainline freight and passenger work until being retired by the railroad in 1956. Instead of being dismantled for scrap, 261 was preserved and donated to the National Railroad Museum in Green Bay, Wisconsin in 1958. Today, the locomotive is owned, operated and maintained by the Minneapolis-based nonprofit organization Friends of the 261, which runs occasional and seasonal excursion trains using the locomotive. The steam engine, restored in 1993, has logged more than  under its own power since that time.

History

Revenue service and retirement (1944–1958)
Built by the American Locomotive Company in July 1944, 261 was originally operated by Milwaukee Road. It operated on the railroad pulling mostly freight trains on the eastern portions of the route, but was also skilled at pulling fast passenger trains as well, and was assigned to the Milwaukee Division by March 1954. It was then retired in August 1956 and was eventually donated to the National Railroad Museum in Green Bay, Wisconsin. As the new museum's first acquisition, 261 was moved to the museum site in 1958.

Excursion service
In 1991, the newly formed "North Star Rail" selected 261 for restoration for mainline excursions. It was selected for a variety of reasons. The engine was large enough to handle the expected trains at track speed. It featured several modern features for a steam locomotive, including easier to maintain roller bearings. It also already had its asbestos lagging removed, which is very expensive to remove for environmental and safety reasons. Finally, 261's relatively short 10-year service life meant that the engine's boiler is more pristine, meaning it would take less work to rebuild the engine.

North Star Rail and the National Railroad Museum came to an agreement in November 1991 for a ten-year lease, which was later renewed ten years later. 261 was moved from Green Bay to Minneapolis to the GE shops at Humboldt Yard in September 1992. There, a full-time staff rebuilt the engine. Work progressed quickly, allowing for a hydrostatic test in June 1993, a test fireup in July, and eventual restoration completion in September. After passing the FRA inspection on September 14, 1993, the engine deadheaded over Wisconsin Central in time for its first public excursions on September 18–19, 1993. The engine later returned to its new home at the leased Burlington Northern Minneapolis Junction facility.

The following year, 261 had an extensive season, including excursions on Wisconsin Central and the Twin Cities & Western Railroad. Notable events included "Chocolate City Days" excursions, campaign trains, a movie shoot painted as "Lackawanna 1661", running over CSX tracks for the famed "New River Train", and a wrap-up celebrating the engine's 50th birthday in 1994.

The engine participated in the Steamtown National Historic Site's grand opening in July 1995. Over five days, 261 deadheaded from Minneapolis to Scranton, Pennsylvania. The locomotive stayed in Scranton for the next year pulling numerous excursions, including rare-mileage trips, a rare snowplow run, and the engine's first steam doubleheader with Susquehanna and Western SY 2-8-2 No. 142. A Hancock 3-chime whistle was temporarily added to the locomotive and then replaced with an AT&SF 6-chime whistle, which remains on it today, but still also keeping its original non-Hancock 3 chime whistle and Leslie A-125 air horn. 261 returned to the Midwest after almost a year at Steamtown. On its way home, the engine made its first runs over the newly formed BNSF Railway. It pulled a few sets of excursions in 1997 and 1998 over BNSF and TC&W trackage.

The year of 1998 presented 261 with its biggest assignment yet, as it was the first steam engine to pull BNSF's Employee Appreciation Special. The engine led a BNSF locomotive and a dozen of BNSF's business-car fleet around the upper Midwest portion of BNSF's route. This brought the engine back to Chicago before heading north to North Dakota and Montana, then through Minneapolis into Iowa before the EAS concluded at Topeka Railroad Days. 261 ended the 1998 operating season after a few more days on BNSF tracks.

The 1999 season was short, with a weekend excursion in May from Minneapolis to Duluth along with runs on the Lake Superior Railroad Museum's tracks and another excursion in September. The year 2000 saw 261 leading excursions out of places such as Chicago, Omaha, and Kansas City. The engine also led an AAPRCO private-car special on August 29 to Duluth. The engine then led a long circle-trip over the Duluth, Missabe and Iron Range Railway as well as the North Shore Railroad System before heading back home. The 2001 season had excursions out of Minneapolis and Montevideo over BNSF and TC&W tracks during June and July, with a complete set of Hiawatha passenger cars. The next year, 261 pulled an almost-matching consist between Minneapolis and Chicago. At this point, insurance rates were skyrocketing due to outside events, as well as new Federal Railroad Administration (FRA) guidelines. The Friends of the 261 had an insurance policy to run through 2002, making these trips among the last time that the group could afford to have 261 run solo.

In the following months, some major changes were made to the Friends of the 261's operations. With insurance being too high to charge reasonable ticket prices, the group decided to team up with Amtrak. Amtrak is self-insured, so the added cost of excursion insurance was much less. However, Amtrak requires that all equipment meet Amtrak certification. The engine became the second steam engine to become Amtrak-certified, and the Friends of the 261 began to buy or rebuild coaches that would meet Amtrak specifications. The first team-up with Amtrak occurred in October 2003, with the engine's return to old Milwaukee Road tracks between Minneapolis and Winona, Minnesota. These trips were repeated each year until 2011.

2004–2008

In June 2004, the engine made its first return visit to Milwaukee since being restored, overnighting on its way to Chicago to participate in the Grand Excursion: an approximate reenactment of the original Grand Excursion of 1854. It departed from Chicago, arriving in Rock Island, Illinois to celebrate the 150th anniversary of the first railroad to reach the Mississippi River. During the Grand Excursion, 261 made day trips to Savanna, Illinois over the Iowa, Chicago and Eastern Railroad, and to Bureau Junction, Illinois on the Iowa Interstate Railroad, current owner/operator of the first railroad line to the Mississippi River. The train then traveled north along IC&E rails near the river, making overnight stops at Dubuque, Iowa and La Crosse, Wisconsin. The final leg up to the Twin Cities operated in Wisconsin on BNSF trackage.

261 ran excursions from Minneapolis to Duluth via BNSF trackage in both 2005 and 2007.

Three June 2006 excursions were launched from Milwaukee: a dinner train in Friday, June 23 to Sturtevant, Wisconsin, and Saturday and Sunday excursions (24th and 25th) to Wisconsin Dells. For these runs, the train was turned at New Lisbon. These excursions would be repeated in August 2008.

In September 2006, 261 and its train visited Rock Island, Illinois as part of RiverWay 2006, a Quad Cities celebration of the 150th anniversary of the first railroad bridge across the Mississippi River in 1856. As part of the festivities, 261's train was coupled to a pair of Chinese-built QJ 2-10-2 steam locomotives 6988 and 7081 for a trip to Homestead, Iowa, on September 15, 2006. The next day, 261 was added to run a "triple-header" from Rock Island to Bureau Junction, Illinois; then, on the following day, the QJs pulled the train, without 261, to Muscatine, Iowa, and back. Diesels were not used on any of these excursions.

In September 2007, Canadian Pacific 2816 and 261 reunited for another doubleheader to Winona. No diesels or water cars were used on the trip. The Friends of the 261 had helped the Canadian Pacific Railway plan 2816's return to the United States, as well as providing half of the consist 2816 led.

In May 2008, 261 was featured on a photo charter on the Twin Cities and Western Railroad. Following this, the engine was moved to Chicago for filming in Public Enemies, a movie based on the life of John Dillinger and starring Johnny Depp and Christian Bale. Though 261 was built ten years after Dillinger died, the engine did fit the bill for a steam engine that could be filmed at Chicago Union Station. The engine's final excursion before the required FRA "15 year inspection" for 261 was a run in September 2008 on Canadian Pacific's ex-Milwaukee Road line from Minneapolis to Winona, with a return on BNSF's ex-Burlington Northern line from La Crosse to Minneapolis. Following the engine being pulled from service, The Friends of the 261 quickly began a rebuild of the engine.

Acquisition from the National Railroad Museum (2009–2010)
In 2009, the work on 261 was halted to concentrate efforts on Southern Pacific 4449. The famed "Daylight" was to participate in TrainFestival 2009, and the Friends of the 261 played a major part in the engine being able to participate. The group provided several passenger cars for 4449's excursion from Portland, Oregon, to Owosso, Michigan, that started on July 3, 2009, as well as TrainFestival 2009. After being away for three months, the 4449 arrived in Portland on October 20, 2009. 

In November 2009, the Friends of the 261 and the National Railroad Museum had problems with negotiations over lease agreements. The museum was asking too much for the Friends to pay, especially while in the middle of a large overhaul. The Friends of the 261 decided to end the lease with the National Railroad Museum, citing the high costs, and began looking for another locomotive to restore.

In mid-January 2010, the engine was found on the website of Sterling Rail, a rail equipment broker, stating that there was a sale pending. The engine was supposedly to be sold to a California-based collector, who would have potentially let the Friends overhaul and operate 261; however, the transaction was never completed. At the time, Steve Sandberg, CEO of the organization, said he was engaged in talks with other organizations about leasing a different engine. In an email dated November 17, 2009, he informed the National Railroad Museum that his organization had decided to discontinue operating 261, according to Michael E. Telzrow, executive director of the National Railroad Museum. Per the terms of their agreement, the Friends of the 261 would be responsible for returning the locomotive to the Museum. However, the Friends of the 261 finally were able to purchase the locomotive in May 2010 for $225,000, keeping it in Minneapolis and returning it to operation upon its rebuild.

Second excursion career (2013–present)
On September 29, 2012, 261 was test-fired and ran under its own power once again for the first time since 2008.

In April 2013, it successfully operated a test train on the Twin Cities and Western Railroad. It ran normally from Minneapolis and then operated tender-first back to Minneapolis.

On May 11, 2013 (National Train Day), 261 ran on an excursion north from Minneapolis to Duluth, where it met Soo Line 4-6-2 No. 2719 for the first time, along with Duluth and Northern Minnesota 2-8-2 No. 14. 261 stayed in Duluth overnight and had a photo shoot with 2719. On May 12, 261 returned to Minneapolis. Amtrak P42DC #17 joined 261 for this trip.

On October 12, 2013, 261 made a round-trip fall-color excursion to Willmar, Minnesota. On October 13, 2013, 261 made a second round-trip excursion to Boylston, Wisconsin. Amtrak P40DC #824 joined 261 for these trips.

On September 27, 2014, 261 ran on a round-trip Fall Colors Excursion to Duluth, returning to Minneapolis on September 28. The excursion traveled on BNSF's Hinckley Subdivision. Amtrak P42DC #174 joined 261 for this trip.

In 2014, 261 operated the Inaugural "North Pole Express" in St. Paul. For two weekends, 261 operated out of St. Paul Union Depot pulling short trips decorated for this excursion. It reprised its role as the locomotive for the "North Pole Express" at St. Paul Union Depot from 2015 to 2022, operating over two weekends each December. During the 2022 run, the locomotive only operated the first weekend; the 32A operated trains the second.

In October 2015, 261 attended the 2015 Railway Interchange Show in Minneapolis on October 4–7. On October 10, 261 pulled a daytime round-trip excursion to Boylston, WI, where it was wyed and returned to Minneapolis. The next day, 261 did the same to Willmar, MN, but used a turntable to face forward for the return to Minneapolis. Amtrak's Phase IV heritage unit #184 joined 261 for both trips.

261 traveled to St. Paul Union Depot under steam to be displayed along other equipment for "Union Depot Train Days", celebrating the 90th anniversary of the building. It was featured in a night photo shoot with Soo Line 2500, an EMD FP7.

On June 4, 2016, 261 ran a round-trip to Duluth, Minnesota, returning to Minneapolis on June 5. Amtrak had been power short, so 261 performed this trip on its own. In September 2016, 261 operated on Twin Cities and Western Railroad and Minnesota Prairie Line trackage. The Minnesota Prairie Line is former Chicago and North Western Railway trackage that originally belonged to the Minneapolis and St. Louis Railway. 261 operated as far west as Winthrop, Minnesota. It was the first time in 60 years that a steam engine had operated on the Minnesota Prairie Line. The same route was operated in the fall of 2017.

In October 2016, 261 operated three round-trips from Minneapolis on the Twin Cities and Western Railroad, running on former Milwaukee Road tracks. 261 operated without a diesel helper except to be pulled back to Minneapolis, as there were no places to turn the train around.

In June 2017, 261 operated on the Red River Valley and Western Railroad in North Dakota.

Due to changes made to Amtrak's policy for charter trains in 2018, 261 was unable to perform a majority of excursions, including an excursion to Duluth that was supposed to take place in June of that year.

On September 8 and 9, 2018, Friends of the 261 operated two excursions for Fall Color and Gourmet Express where they operated west from Minneapolis to Glencoe, Minnesota on Twin Cities and Western trackage,  with a stop near Norwood Young America, Minnesota for the gourmet food and wine and a photo runby.

On September 22, 2018, for the 25th anniversary of the first excursion in 1993, 261 pulled a special train for the annual convention of the American Association of Private Railroad Car Owners (AAPRCO).

In May 2019, after an agreement made in January, Friends of the 261 acquired former Milwaukee Road EMD E9 #32A from the Wisconsin and Southern Railroad, which is owned by Watco. First showcased at Union Depot Day from May 31 to June 2, it pulled its first excursion on June 22, still painted in Wisconsin and Southern colors minus the former lettering. The E9 locomotive has since been repainted into Milwaukee colors and debuted in its new paint scheme on May 12, 2021.

In June 2019, 261 pulled two excursions for the Milwaukee Road Historical Association convention being held in Minneapolis, called "261 Hiawatha". On June 22, 2019, the train operated from Minneapolis to Brownton, Minnesota on the Twin Cities and Western. On June 23, 2019, the train traveled between Minneapolis and Norwood/Young America on TC&W, then from Norwood to Winthrop on TC&W subsidiary Minnesota Prairie Line: a rare-mileage trip for 261.

On September 21 and 22, 2019, there were two excursions for the Gourmet Express.

On March 11, 2021, a $200,000 proposal was made to convert No. 261's firebox from burning coal to oil. However, this is not the first time an S3 class was converted to oil, as Nos. 262, 263, 267 and 269 were converted to oil during their revenue careers.

References

Further reading

External links

Friends of the 261
Steam Locomotive Information
Photo Gallery
Excursion Archive
Steam Diary

261
ALCO locomotives
Individual locomotives of the United States
4-8-4 locomotives
Railway locomotives introduced in 1944
Standard gauge locomotives of the United States
Preserved steam locomotives of Minnesota
Passenger locomotives
Freight locomotives